Highway Star may refer to:
"Highway Star" (song), a song on Deep Purple's 1972 album Machine Head
Highway Star, the band that became Stiff Little Fingers
Highway Star (manga), a 1979 graphic novel by Katsuhiro Otomo
Highway Star (film)
Highway Star, a Stand featured in Diamond is Unbreakable named after the Deep Purple song
Highway Star or Rad Racer, a 1987 NES video game by Square
Highway Star is car model brand name of Nissan